Liga Futebol Timor-Leste (LFTL) is a league competition featuring football clubs from Timor Leste. It replaced Super Liga Timorense in 2015. The competition initially consisted of two main divisions, the Primeira Divisão and Segunda Divisão, however was expanded to include a third division in 2019. As of 2020 the winner of the previous Premeria Divisão season represents Timor Leste in the AFC Cup.

In 2020 the name of the competition was renamed from the Liga Futebol Amadora to the Liga Futebol Timor-Leste. The league did not run however due to the COVID pandemic, with the teams set to compete in the Pimeira and Segunda Divisão instead competing in the Copa FFTL.

Liga Futebol Timor-Leste is also the name of the governing body of the league competition which also organises a knock-out cup competition the Taça 12 de Novembro and a super cup, the LFA Super Taça.

List of Champions

Primeira Divisão
2016: Sport Laulara e Benfica
2017: Karketu Dili
2018: Boavista FC
2019: Lalenok United
2020: Not done
2021: Karketu Dili

Segunda Divisão
2016: Cacusan CF
2017: Atlético Ultramar
2018: Assalam FC
2019: DIT FC
2020: Not done
2021: Emmanuel FC

Terceira Divisão
2016: Not done
2017: Not done
2018: Not done
2019: Emmanuel FC
2020: Not done
2021: Not done

LFA Board Director
President : Nilton Gusmão dos Santos
Vice-president : Alexander Vong
Director of Competition : Martinho Ribeiro
Executive Secretary : Sergio Hornai

List of LFA Presidents
2015–present : Nilton Gusmão

References

External links
Official website
Official Facebook page
Youth League Facebook page

 
1
Sports leagues established in 2015
2015 establishments in East Timor